The Designated Player Rule, nicknamed the Beckham Rule, allows Major League Soccer franchises to sign up to three players that would be considered outside their salary cap (either by offering the player higher wages or by paying a transfer fee for the player). The rule, which was adopted ahead of the 2007 MLS season, enables teams to compete for star players in the international football market. The rule is one of two mechanisms by which MLS teams may exceed their salary cap, the other being allocation money. As of December 2019, there have been 209 Designated Players in league history.

The rule is informally named after David Beckham, in anticipation of MLS teams signing lucrative deals with internationally recognized players, after Beckham entered into negotiations to join the league. Beckham was the first player signed under this rule, signing a five-year contract with the Los Angeles Galaxy with a guaranteed annual salary of $6.5 million.

History
The team salary cap was estimated to be around US$1.9 million in 2006, was $2.1 million in 2007, and was raised to $2.3 million for the 2008 season. As part of the 2010 Collective Bargaining Agreement between MLS and the MLS Players' Union, the 2010 salary cap was $2.55 million, with an automatic five percent increase each year until the expiration of the agreement at the end of the 2014 season.

Under the 2007 rule:
The rule expires at the end of the 2009 season, and must be renewed then or allowed to lapse.
For each Designated Player, $400,000 of his salary is charged to the salary cap and paid by the league, with any remaining salary being paid by the team's owner.  This value was increased for the 2009 season to $415,000.
Prior to the 2007 season, there were three players whose salary exceeded $400,000.  These players were Landon Donovan, Carlos Ruiz, and Eddie Johnson.  According to the rule, these players were grandfathered in for the 2007 season, and the exemption was extended after the 2007 season, with the league planning to review the issue at a future date.  It was possible that the league would be required to renegotiate these players' contracts or consider them Designated Players.  However, prior to the start of the 2008 season, Johnson moved to Fulham of the Premier League, while following Dwayne De Rosario's signing by Toronto FC in January 2009, Ruiz was released by the club and left MLS to play for Olimpia Asunción.  This left Donovan as the lone player whose 2009 salary remained grandfathered under the exemption provision. However, there were several more players whose guaranteed salary exceeded the Designated Player amount, but whose salary cap expense was actually lower than their true salary due to the allocation rule.  These players include Shalrie Joseph ($450,000), Christian Gomez ($430,000), Dwayne De Rosario ($425,750), and Taylor Twellman ($420,000).
Each team initially had one Designated Player spot, but could trade their Designated Spot to another team; teams were allowed a maximum of two Designated Players.
Only $325,000 of a team's second Designated Player counted against the salary cap, which was increased to $335,000 in 2009.

The 2010 changes:
The rule has no expiration date.
For each Designated Player, $335,000 of his salary is charged to the salary cap and paid by the league ($167,500 for DP players joining during the MLS summer transfer window), with any remaining salary being paid by the team's owner.  This amount is halved for Designated Players signed in the middle of the season.  The salary cap value of Designated Players can also be reduced using allocation money.  Finally, teams whose Designated Players transfer abroad in the middle of a season can recoup part of the Designated Players' salary cap value.
Landon Donovan is no longer grandfathered into the rule and must be considered a Designated Player.
Each team is allowed two Designated Player spots, and they can no longer trade their Designated Player spots.  The New York Red Bulls will receive $70,000 in allocation money in return for the nullification of their 2007 trade with Chivas USA for an additional Designated Player spot.  This means that both New York and Chivas USA will have two Designated Player spots for the 2010 season.
Teams can pay a $250,000 "luxury tax" for the right to sign a third Designated Player.  This $250,000 would be distributed equally to all MLS teams that have not signed a third Designated Player in the form of allocation money.

The 2012 changes:

Starting with the 2012 season, the rule was changed with respect to younger players. MLS announced the changes in August 2011 after clubs expressed concern about signing young international players with no guarantees that they would develop into stars.

 Designated Players over the age of 23 will carry a salary budget charge of $350,000, unless the player joins his club in the middle of the season, in which case his budget charge will be $175,000.
 Designated Players 21–23 years old count as $200,000 against the club's salary budget.
 Designated Players 20 years old or younger count as $150,000 against the club's salary budget.
 The budget charge for the midseason signing of a young Designated Player (23 years old and younger) is $150,000 and this amount cannot be lowered with allocation funds. 
 Clubs will not have to buy the third DP roster slot to accommodate Designated Players 23 years old and younger.
 Age of player is determined by year (not date) of birth.

The maximum budget charge for Designated Players over age 23 was increased to $368,750 for 2013, $387,500 in 2014, $436,250 in 2015, $457,500 in 2016, and $480,625 in 2017. The budget charge for those who join during the midseason transfer window has remained at one-half of the full-season cap charge since the inception of the rule. The budget charges for younger players have not changed since 2012.

Background
The rule is informally named after David Beckham, in anticipation of MLS teams signing lucrative deals with internationally recognized players of Beckham's caliber. Beckham was the first player to be signed under this rule, signing a lucrative contract with the Los Angeles Galaxy worth up to $250 million over five years, with direct guaranteed compensation from MLS and Galaxy at $6.5 million a year.

Current Designated Players

Notes
 Chart indicates when players signed their current Designated Player contract, not necessarily their first year in MLS.
 Other players in MLS may also be paid a salary that takes them above the Designated Player threshold, but they have had their salary reduced against the salary cap using General or Targeted Allocation Money.
 Player salaries may be below the Designated Player threshold, but their transfer fee might mean the total compensation takes them above the threshold.
 Player salaries include compensation from their MLS contract, not including any bonuses or compensation from contracts with individual teams or their affiliates.

Club DP history

Notes
 The below list indicates players who have had their contract assigned as a Designated Player (DP) contract during their time in MLS. Players may have not always have had a DP contract, or have later had their contract negotiated below a DP level. Similarly, some players have been in MLS whose salary has been at a DP level, but the club has opted to bring their salary below the DP threshold using General Allocation Money or Targeted Allocation Money. Their listed "Years as DP" indicates what seasons they were active as a DP for that club only. Players in bold are currently signed to a DP contract by their club.
 Former MLS sides Miami Fusion and Tampa Bay Mutiny were dissolved before the introduction of the Designated Player Rule.

Atlanta United FC

Austin FC

Charlotte FC

Chicago Fire FC

Chivas USA (defunct)

FC Cincinnati

Colorado Rapids

Columbus Crew

FC Dallas

D.C. United

Houston Dynamo FC

Inter Miami CF

Sporting Kansas City

LA Galaxy

Los Angeles FC

Minnesota United FC

CF Montréal

Nashville SC

New England Revolution

New York City FC

New York Red Bulls

Orlando City SC

Philadelphia Union

Portland Timbers

Real Salt Lake

St. Louis City SC

San Jose Earthquakes

Seattle Sounders FC

Toronto FC

Vancouver Whitecaps FC

Past and present Designated Players by country

See also

Allocation money
Franchise player

References

External links
Designated Players glossary entry at MLSsoccer.com

Major League Soccer rules and regulations
Association football terminology
Association football player non-biographical articles
David Beckham